George McArthur Yardley (8 October 1942 – 14 November 2018) was a Scottish footballer. Yardley began his career as a goalkeeper before becoming a centre forward, most notably for Tranmere Rovers F.C.

Playing career

Born in Kirkcaldy, Fife, Yardley played his first football as a goalkeeper as an eight-year-old playing for Dunnikier Primary School. However, on moving to Temple Hall Secondary School he was forced to play as a forward because another goalkeeper was already playing. At Frances Colliery Juniors he played mostly as a forward, occasionally playing in goal.

In 1959 he signed an amateur contract with East Fife as a goalkeeper. After sustaining a hand injury in 1960 Yardley switched to primarily playing as a forward though he did play a number of matches in goal. In 1964 Yardley trialled with Forfar Athletic, playing four matches. He then played out the second half of the 1963/1964 season with Montrose.

Yardley played for Australian club St. George-Budapest in three separate stints. He played one season at St. George during the 1965 Australian season after emigrating to Australia in August 1964.

On returning from Australia in October 1966, Yardley trialled for a month with English Fourth Division team Luton Town, playing one match. In November 1966 he moved to Tranmere Rovers. In four seasons between 1966 and 1970 he played 123 matches, scoring 68 goals. He was leading goal scorer for Rovers on four separate occasions.

His second stint in Australia was in 1969 before returning to Tranmere Rovers. At the completion of his career at Tranmere he moved again to Australia. Yardley had a short stint with Altrincham in the 1973–74 season.

International career
Yardley played one match on 5 March 1960 for Scotland Amateurs against Wales at Rugby Park in Kilmarnock, which ended 3-3.

Personal life

After his football career, Yardley became a design draughtsman on the Wirral.  He died on 14 November 2018 in a care home at Dalgety Bay, Fife.

References

External links

1942 births
2018 deaths
Footballers from Kirkcaldy
Association football goalkeepers
Association football forwards
Scottish footballers
Tranmere Rovers F.C. players
Luton Town F.C. players
East Fife F.C. players
Forfar Athletic F.C. players
Montrose F.C. players
Altrincham F.C. players
St. George Saints players
Scottish Football League players
English Football League players
Scottish expatriate footballers
Expatriate soccer players in Australia